The 39th Cuban National Series was marked by Santiago de Cuba's remarkable postseason run to win its second straight National Series. Under the direction of manager Higinio Vélez, the Avispas won eleven straight games in the playoffs, sweeping Camagüey, Granma and finally Pinar del Río.

Standings

Group A

Group B

Group C

Group D

Playoffs

References

 (Note - text is printed in a white font on a white background, depending on browser used.)

Cuban National Series seasons
Base
Base
Cuba
1999 in baseball